Royal Air Force Wye or RAF Wye was temporary Royal Flying Corps First World War training airfield at Wye, Kent, England.

History
No. 20 Reserve Squadron moved from nearby Dover on 1 June 1916, it operated the Avro 504 biplane trainer, the Royal Aircraft Factory RE.8 a two-seat biplane reconnaissance and bomber and the Royal Aircraft Factory B.E.2 reconnaissance biplane. In January 1917 No. 51 Reserve Squadron arrived as the demand for aircrew for the Western Front increased and in May 1917 a third squadron (No. 66 Reserve Squadron) was formed from personnel and equipment from the two squadrons. At the end of May the Reserve Squadrons (now renamed Training Squadrons) moved out of Wye when the aerodrome was allocated for use as an Anglo-American training airfield.

Three metal-clad aeroplane sheds were erected to join the original portable Bessonneau hangar and in May 1917 65 Squadron was based with Sopwith Camels for four months before it moved to France. No. 86 Squadron moved in from Dover with Sopwith Pup and Sopwith Camel biplane fighters to train at the end of 1917. In December 1917 No. 42 Training Squadron arrived and continued to train British pilots which were joined in the mid-1918 by Americans trainees. Following the Armistice with Germany the Americans departed but the training carried on, albeit not at the same pace until the training squadron was disbanded on 1 February 1919.

Between February and May 1919 the aerodrome was used by 3 Squadron when it returned from France. RAF Wye was declared surplus to requirements in October 1919 and was restored to agricultural use.

Royal Flying Corps/Royal Air Force units and aircraft

Accidents and incidents
On 15 March 1917 Captain Oliver Bryson was awarded the Albert Medal for his rescue of his passenger following a crash at Wye Aerodrome:

References
Notes

Bibliography

 
 

Royal Air Force stations in Kent
Royal Flying Corps airfields
Royal Flying Corps airfields in Kent
Borough of Ashford